The following is a list of video game characters featured in the Fatal Fury fighting game series developed by SNK. The series consists of the original Fatal Fury, Fatal Fury 2, Fatal Fury Special, Fatal Fury 3, Real Bout Fatal Fury, Real Bout Fatal Fury Special, Real Bout Fatal Fury 2, Fatal Fury: Wild Ambition, and Garou: Mark of the Wolves.

Creation and design
Series' creator Takashi Nishiyama said the depth of the characters was of great importance when making the series. He noted that the plot were more polished in the first Fatal Fury than in his previous work, the first Street Fighter. This allowed them to reveal more character details which in turn lead to more fans. Some details about the characters were revealed in magazines rather than the games to produce more marketing.

Character appearances
The table below summarizes every single fighter in the series. A green cell indicates the character as playable, while a red cell indicates that the character is not playable or does not appear.

Notes

Introduced in Fatal Fury

Andy Bogard 

Andy Bogard (アンディー・ボガード, Andī Bogādo) is Terry Bogard's younger brother. Andy practices the Shiranui-ryū ("Shiranui style" in Japanese) Ninjutsu and a form of empty-handed ninja combat called Koppō-ken, which he trained in after witnessing his foster father's murder, in order to gain revenge on Geese Howard. Mai is the girl he grew up with who is madly in love with him and self-proclaimed him her fiancé and the granddaughter of Hanzo Shiranui, the man he learned Ninjitsu from. It was after his foster father Jeff's death that Tung Fu Rue took responsibility for raising him and Terry. Andy went to Japan to train under Hanzo and grew up alongside Mai, while Terry stayed in Southtown. During Andy's time in Japan, he met the Muay Thai fighter Joe Higashi and challenged him to a match. When Andy won, he invited Joe to return to America with him to enter the King of Fighters tournament, held by Geese.

Late in the tournament, Andy tried to kill off Geese by himself. Geese's power proved to be too much for Andy as he almost fell to his death. Terry saved Andy, who then acknowledged Terry as the superior fighter. After Terry beat Geese at the end of their first King of Fighters Tournament, a new tournament was held, this time hosted by Krauser. Andy, while present in the tournament, did not accomplish much story-wise.

Ever since Geese's death, the fall of the First Southtown and the birth of Second Southtown, Andy has been busy training his young apprentice Hokutomaru in the ways of the Shiranui-style ninjitsu and Koppo-ken. Instead of fighting in the KOF: Maximum Mayhem tournament himself, Andy sends Hokutomaru in his place to see what his apprentice has learned. In Hokutomaru's ending, Andy writes him a note saying that he was proud of how strong Hokutomaru has gotten. Then he ended the note by saying he is no longer his teacher but his rival and that they will cross paths again.

When the new King of Fighters '94 tournament was announced, Andy joined Terry and Joe in the new 3-on-3 matches. Since then, Andy has always agreed to follow his brother Terry whenever he decided to enter the new version of the King of Fighters tournament. The Fatal Fury Team maintained his original formation (Terry, Andy and Joe) from King of Fighters '94 to '98. With new rules in KOF '99 allowing teams of four members, Mai Shiranui (in KOF '99) and, later, Blue Mary (KOF 2000) joined the team. After the beginning of the Ash Crimson Saga (KOF 2003, XI) Andy left the Fatal Fury team to take care of Shiranui disciple Hokutomaru, who fell sick and Mai went after him. Andy made his return to The King of Fighters XII but does not participate in a defined team. The King of Fighters XIII sees Andy rejoining the Fatal Fury team as his brother's interest in the tournament has compelled him to reunite the original Fatal Fury team from the 1994 event. In his anime incarnations, though sometimes perplexed by her actions, Andy is more open to showing his affection towards Mai.

Billy Kane

Duck King 

Duck King (ダック・キング, Dakku Kingu) appears in the original Fatal Fury as one of the first four opponents in the single-player mode. Possessing incredible talent when it comes to brawling and street dancing, Duck King once challenged Terry Bogard to a street fight and lost. He trained himself in order to surpass Terry. Duck uses a unique fighting style which includes rhythmical dance-like movements and attacks. His primary special move is a flying cannonball technique.

In Fatal Fury 2, Duck was one of the characters from the original game who is defeated by Krauser in one of the games cut scenes, although he would appear as a playable character in Fatal Fury Special. He would retain his cannonball technique, now dubbed the Head Spin Attack, along with new special moves such as the Dancing Dive, Break Storm, and the Beat Rush. He also has a new hidden special move called the Break Spiral. From  Special and onward, Duck would be accompanied by his pet chick "P-chan". He makes another quick cameo in Bob Wilson's ending Fatal Fury 3 before returning as a playable character in Real Bout Fatal Fury and its sequels, Real Bout Special and Real Bout 2. He also appears as an exclusive character in the PlayStation version of Fatal Fury: Wild Ambition.

Although Duck King has made numerous cameo appearances thorough The King of Fighters series, including as an alternate Striker (a character who helps the player in battle) in The King of Fighters 2000, he did not appear as a playable character until The King of Fighters XI, where he appears as a member of the new Fatal Fury Team along with Terry and Kim Kaphwan.

Geese Howard

Hwa Jai 

 is the first of three opponents the player faces in the original Fatal Fury before the final match against Geese Howard. A former Muay Thai champion once nicknamed , he once fought against Joe Higashi in the past and lost, causing him to lose his title. Seeking to defeat Joe, he became a more reckless and dangerous fighter. After being banned from competing in the Muay Thai circuit, his brutal talent was noted by Geese Howard, who hired him to serve as one of his bodyguards and a participant in the King of Fighters tournament. His special technique, the Dragon Kick, was developed to compete with Joe's Tiger Kick. He also gains additional strength by drinking a sort of Super Drink, which thrown at him by one of Geese's men when he is in danger.

In Fatal Fury 2, Hwa Jai is one of the characters from the original game who gets defeated by an unknown challenger (Wolfgang Krauser). He is apparently hospitalized and visited by Joe Higashi, as seen in Joe's ending in the game and in Fatal Fury Special. He makes further cameos in the subsequent Fatal Fury games (Fatal Fury 3, Real Bout, Real Bout Special and Real Bout 2) as Joe's training partner and trainer. Despite having been absent since his original appearance as an opponent character in Fatal Fury, Hwa Jai has been confirmed to return in The King of Fighters XIII and marks the first time the character has been playable. Kim, following his "reform" of his previous teammates (Chang Koehan and Choi Bounge), seeks out Hwa Jai and Raiden as he believes they still work under Geese Howard. It is not the case as Geese had returned to America long ago but Raiden manages to talk Hwa Jai into joining the team to bolster their reputations as fighters. Hwa Jai accepts, partially due to wanting to fight Joe once again.

Joe Higashi

Michael Max 
 is a black boxer who appears in the original Fatal Fury as one of the first four CPU-controlled opponents whom the player faces. Prior to the events of the game, Michael was a young boxing prodigy who was once considered a strong contender for the title of Worldwide Heavyweight Champion. However, he left the boxing circuit to seek real combat and participate in the King of Fighters tournament, feeling that professional boxing was a mere sport protected by rules. He is also the friend and student of boxing of Axel Hawk. His only other appearances in the series includes in the cut-scenes of Fatal Fury 2, where he is one of the fighters defeated by Wolfgang Krauser, and in Axel Hawks ending in Fatal Fury Special, where he is depicted as Axel's trainer. In one of his victory poses, it is revealed that he is Catholic. Michael Max is the only character from the original Fatal Fury that has never appeared in The King of Fighters series until he makes a cameo at one of The King of Fighters XV trailer.

Raiden / Big Bear 

 first appears in the original Fatal Fury as the second of the final four computer-controlled opponents in the single-player mode. He was once a popular face wrestler until he was betrayed by his tag partner during a match (a character later revealed to be Big Bombarder from the SNK wrestling game 3 Count Bout). This incident transformed him completely and he became a notorious heel wrestler. Not satisfied with venting his frustration in the ring, he enters the King of Fighters tournament as a masked fighter, acting as one of Geese's guardians. His primary special move in the game is the Vapor Breath. This character was modeled after real life pro wrestler Big Van Vader.

He trains at his native land of Australia, where his deadly strength increased on several levels. He also develops a friendly rivalry with Terry, as seen in his endings in both games. His special moves in Fatal Fury 2 includes the Giant Bomb, a rushing tackle, and the Super Drop Kick. He also has a hidden special move called the Fire Breath, an improved version of his Vapor Breath. In Special, he gains a new special move called the Bear Bomber.

Fatal Fury: Wild Ambition, being a retelling of the original Fatal Fury tournament, depicts Raiden under his masked heel persona once again. Outside the Fatal Fury series, Raiden also appeared in the Capcom-produced crossover game Capcom vs. SNK: Millennium Fight 2000, and its sequels, Capcom vs. SNK Pro and Capcom vs. SNK 2, being one of the few Fatal Fury characters who did not appear in The King of Fighters as a playable character (at the time) in those games. Raiden also appears in The King of Fighters XII and the sequel. In KOF XII none of the characters are assigned into teams but for KOF XIII they are. Raiden's teammates in KOF XIII are Kim Kaphwan and Hwa Jai. Kim is mistaken in thinking Raiden and Hwa Jai are still in the employ of Geese Howard, wanting to "reform" both men. Raiden convinces Hwa Jai to act as if they are so they are able to enter the tournament to build reputation for themselves. The Fatal Fury characters refer him as "Bear", his face persona, which he denies.

Richard Meyer 

 appears in the original Fatal Fury as one of the first four computer-controlled opponents in the single-player mode. A capoeira mestre originally from Brazil, Richard makes his daily living in South Town as the manager of the restaurant Pao Pao Cafe. He competes in the King of Fighters tournament in order to make his capoiera style known to the world. In this game, his character specializes in numerous kick techniques. Richard Meyer was the first fighting game character to use Capoeira.

Richard makes cameo appearances in subsequent Fatal Fury games as a friendly acquaintance of the Bogard brothers and Joe. He appears in Fatal Fury 2 in the cut scene shown immediately after the first battle against the CPU, tending to a crowd of spectators at Pao Pao Cafe witnessing the player's fight on television. He appears again near the end of the game, where he is defeated in battle by Wolfgang Krauser, as well in Terry Bogard's ending, serving him and his date their meal.

In Fatal Fury 3, Richard opens a new Pao Pao Cafe restaurant, which is maintained by his capoeira apprentice Bob Wilson. In Fatal Fury 3, as well as in Real Bout series, Richard appears to cheer and encourage Bob before each of his matches.  He makes cameos in The King of Fighters XI, trying to tell Kim to leave the cafe and in King of Fighters XIII witnessing several female fighters destroy his bar.

Richard appears as a hidden character in the PlayStation 2 game KOF: Maximum Impact 2 (released in North America as The King of Fighters 2006), participating as a fighter for the first time since the original Fatal Fury.

Terry Bogard

Tung Fu Rue 

 is one of the first four opponents the players faces in the original Fatal Fury (when either Andy or Terry defeats him in Fatal Fury Special, each Bogard brother addresses him as "Master Tan"). In the past, he trained Terry and Andys adoptive father, Jeff Bogard, and his nemesis Geese Howard (as well as Cheng Sinzan). He raised the Bogard brothers after Jeff was killed by Geese and participates in the King of Fighters tournament in the first game with the objective to defeat Geese. He can transform his body into steel and draw out great power using a deadly secret technique known only to himself. In the game, he appears as meek elderly man, but after taking a bit of damage, he transforms into a musclebound warrior, whose special moves including a flying whirlwind punch and a spinning whirlwind kick in which he shoots fireballs at both directions.

In Fatal Fury 2, Tung was one of the characters defeated by Wolfgang Krauser in one of the game's cut-scene. He would appear as a playable character in Fatal Fury Special, the upgraded version of Fatal Fury 2. Unlike the original game, Tung only transforms into a musclebound version of himself while performing certain special moves. Tung reappears in Real Bout Special and Real Bout 2. In Real Bout Special, there are two versions of him in the game. In regular version of him has improved versions of his previous special moves, as well as new moves, while the alternate version of him (EX Tung Fu Rue) has all of his moves from Fatal Fury Special and one Hidden Ability. In Real Bout 2, Tung has special moves from both versions of his character in the previous game.

Tung also appears in the SNK crossover game NeoGeo Battle Coliseum. This version of the character was used as an additional character in the PlayStation 2 port of The King of Fighters XI, until he canonically participates in The King of Fighters XIV. He is also one of the 20 background characters that appears in the King Of Fighters Stadium Stage in Super Smash Bros. Ultimate.

In The King of Fighters timeline, Tung played a vital role in XIV. According to a profile of one of his disciples, and the protagonist central character of that arc, Shun'ei, Tung found Shun'ei after his biological parents abandoned him for having an eerie powers, related to the main antagonist of that arc. Sensing a good in the young eerie powered boy, Tung decided to raise Shun'ei as his disciple to be trained by himself against the villains who had a connection to Shun'ei's eerie power, such as the villain who is connected to Shun'ei's left-half power, an avatar of fiery rage and soul containing entity known as Verse. Additionally, he has met Kyo Kusanagi's father, Saisyu Kusanagi, and a fellow elderly Chinese martial arts master, Chin Gentsai sometime before.

Introduced in Fatal Fury 2 and Fatal Fury Special

Axel Hawk 

 first appears in Fatal Fury 2 as the second of the final four opponents in the single-player mode. A former heavyweight boxing champion, he was said to be the strongest of all time until his retirement. According to his backstory, he began spending most of his days at home after his retirement, playing with his R/C car and being supported by his elderly mother, his father having died at some point. One day, he received an anonymous letter inviting him to the King of Fighters tournament and began training for his comeback. He was originally a non-playable character in the Neo Geo version of Fatal Fury 2, although he is playable in the SNES and Genesis versions of the game. He became a regular playable character in Fatal Fury Special. He is also the teacher of boxing and the best friend of Michael Max. He makes a cameo at the end of The King of Fighters 2003 cheering on the Fatal Fury Team.

Cheng Sinzan 

 is introduced as one of the new playable characters in Fatal Fury 2. A rotund fighter, he practices taiji. Despite his immense strength, he hates training and becomes tired very easily. He enters the King of Fighters tournament seeking to gain international recognition and open his own training hall. He is characterized as one of the richest men in Hong Kong, who resides in a high class neighborhood and is married to a former Miss Hong Kong. Despite his social status, he seeks to find ways to make himself even richer.

He makes a non-playable appearance in Fatal Fury 3, helping Hon-Fu chase after Ryuji Yamazaki and doesn't return as a playable character until Real Bout Special and Real Bout 2. In the backstory of Real Bout Special, it is revealed that Cheng was once a disciple of Tung Fu Rue trained in Hakkyoku Seiken along with Jeff Bogard and Geese Howard, but was expelled due to his greediness. He would also make money by having people bet against him in street fights and then lose on purpose.

Jubei Yamada 

 is one of the five playable characters introduced in Fatal Fury 2. An elderly judo master who was once known as "Yamada, the Demon" during his youth. Jubei Yamada is the best friend and rival of Hanzo Shiranui (the grandfather of Mai Shiranui). Having lost his charm from his younger days, Jubei fights in the new King of Fighters tournament in order to re-establish his popularity with girls around the world. Despite this, he refuses to change his womanizing lecherous ways. Although Jubei does not return as a playable character in later games, he makes several cameo appearances, including in Mai Shiranui's ending in Real Bout Fatal Fury, where he is shown to have an infatuation with her.

Kim Kaphwan

Laurence Blood 

 first appears in Fatal Fury 2 as the third of the four boss characters the player faces at the end of the single-player mode. He is a former Spanish matador who uses a self-styled martial art based on his deadly bullfighting methods (his fighting style is very similar to the fencing, the French martial art of the Savate). He serves as the right-hand man and servant of Wolfgang Krauser and participates in the tournament under his request. He is a computer-only character in the Neo Geo version of Fatal Fury 2 and became playable in Fatal Fury Special. Blood would return as a playable character in Real Bout Special and Real Bout 2. He is notable for being one of five bullfighter characters in fighting games (the other three being Vega of Street Fighter, Miguel of Human Killing Machine, Miguel Caballero Rojo of Tekken, and Kilian of Samurai Shodown). He is also the only boss character from Real Bout Fatal Fury Special and Real Bout Fatal Fury 2 that hasn't appeared in the King of Fighters tournaments.

Mai Shiranui

Ryo Sakazaki

Wolfgang Krauser 

Wolfgang Krauser von Stroheim made his appearance in Fatal Fury 2, where he serves as the final opponent in the tournament. Known as the only man in the world feared by Geese Howard (whom in Fatal Fury Special is revealed to be his elder half-brother from the same father, Rudolph Krauser von Stroheim or Rudolph Von Zanac), Krauser is a German nobleman who is publicly known as the current Earl of Stroheim, a prestigious family in Europe, but within the underworld he is a ruthless warlord known as the Emperor of Darkness. After Geese's supposed death in the original Fatal Fury, Krauser sponsors a new King of Fighters tournament with his three chosen warriors Laurence Blood, Axel Hawk and Billy Kane (a former underling of Geese himself) in order to lure the men who defeated Geese (Terry Bogard, Andy Bogard, and Joe Higashi).

Although Krauser takes his own life following the events of Fatal Fury 2 and Special according to the background story in the subsequent games, Krauser appeared in the special installments of the series, Real Bout Fatal Fury Special and Real Bout Fatal Fury 2.

Outside the Fatal Fury series, Krauser appears as a member of the Boss Team in The King of Fighters '96 with his half-brother Geese and Geese's former partner-in-crime Mr. Big. The Boss Team made another appearance in the remake of The King of Fighters '98 titled The King of Fighters '98 Ultimate Match. Additionally, Krauser also appears as a "Striker" character in the console versions of The King of Fighters 2000.

Krauser serves as the main antagonist in the anime special Fatal Fury 2: The New Battle. According to character designer Masami Ōbari (who also worked on Voltage Fighter Gowcaizer), Krauser was redesigned to be ten years younger than his video game counterpart and given a clean-shaved appearance. In this special, Krauser challenges his half-brother's nemesis Terry Bogard to battle and wins. After Terry regains his courage, he challenges Krauser again and wins the rematch, causing Krauser to commit suicide due to his loss.

Introduced in Fatal Fury 3

Blue Mary

Bob Wilson 

 is a character introduced in Fatal Fury 3 and appears as a playable character throughout the Real Bout sub-series. He is the bartender of Pao Pao Cafe 2 and was trained in capoeira by Richard Meyer. He specializes in spinning kicks and combination attacks.  All of his special moves reference animals in some way, as his Fatal Fury 3 Special Moves are the Wild Wolf, the Bison's Horn, the Lynx's Fang, the Rolling Turtle, and the Hornet Attack. His Super Special Move is the Dangerous Wolf. In Real Bout, he gains the Monkey Dance special move and two Hidden Abilities, the Mad Spin Wolf and the Wolf's Fang. Real Bout Special brings in the Sidewinder, Hunting Frog and Hawk Talon Special Moves, and Real Bout 2 discards Bob's previous Hidden Abilities for a new one called Dancing Bison.

Franco Bash 

 makes his first appearance in Fatal Fury 3 as one of the five new playable characters introduced in the game and also appears thorough the Real Bout sub-series. He is a retired Super Heavyweight-class kickboxing champion who works as a mechanic in South Town Airport to support his wife Emilia, and their son Junior. In Fatal Fury 3 his son is kidnapped by Yamazaki, who blackmails him into helping him obtain the Secret Scrolls of the Jin. He rescues his son in his ending in Fatal Fury 3 and trains to make his comeback in the Real Bout series. He makes a cameo at the end of KOF 2003 cheering on the Fatal Fury Team.

Hon-Fu 

 is introduced in Fatal Fury 3 as one of the new playable characters featured in the game and appears all the games in the Real Bout sub-series. He is a police officer from Hong Kong who specializes in using a nunchaku. His objective throughout Fatal Fury 3 and the Real Bout series is to arrest the escaped convict Ryuji Yamazaki and is aided by Cheng in Fatal Fury 3. He is a close friend of Kim Kaphwan according to his backstory in Fatal Fury 3, as the two have nearly identical desperation attacks, although Hon-Fu was given a new one for Real Bout Fatal Fury 2.

Jin Chonrei 

Jin Chonrei (秦 崇雷, Japanese: Jin Chonrei, Pinyin: Qín Chóngléi, also romanized as Qin Chong-Lei) appears in Fatal Fury 3 as the third and final boss character featured in the game and appears as a regular playable character thorough the Real Bout series. Like his younger brother Chonshu, Chonrei is possessed by the spirit of Jin Kuryu (秦 空龍), the elder son of Jin Ōryū and ancestor of Chonrei and Chonshu. In Fatal Fury 3, they head to South Town to seek the Secret Scrolls of the Jin in order to unleash their true power. The scrolls are eventually taken by Geese Howard and in the next game of the series, Real Bout Fatal Fury, the Jin brothers participate in the King of Fighters tournament to recover them. However, the scrolls are destroyed by Chonrei in the Jin Brothers' endings. In Real Bout Fatal Fury 2, Chonrei becomes an apprentice of Tung Fu Rue, as seen in their corresponding ending (although Kim's ending in the game depicts Chonrei training as Kim's disciple along with his brother). Outside the Fatal Fury series, Jin Chonshu and Jin Chonrei have appeared in Neo Geo Battle Coliseum.

In Gamest's 1997 Heroes Collection, Chonrei was voted as the staff's thirty-ninth favorite character. He shared the spot with four other characters, including Fatal Fury character, Joe Higashi, and Street Fighter character, Zangief.

Jin Chonshu 

Jin Chonshu (秦 崇秀, Pinyin: Qín Chóngxiù) first appears as the second boss character in Fatal Fury 3 and appears thorough the Real Bout series as a regular playable character. He is the younger half of the Jin brothers seeking the Three Secret Scrolls of the Jin. While he appears like a regular teenage boy, he is actually possessed by the spirit of Jin Kairyu (秦　海龍), who was the younger son of Jin Ōryū (秦 王龍), the ancient warlord who wrote the Secret Scrolls of the Jin two thousand years prior to the events of Fatal Fury 3. In Fatal Fury 3, they head to South Town to seek the Secret Scrolls of the Jin in order to unleash their true power. The scrolls are eventually taken by Geese Howard and in the original Real Bout Fatal Fury the Jin brothers participate in the King of Fighters tournament to recover them. However, the scrolls are destroyed by Chonrei in the Jin Brothers' endings. In Real Bout 2, Chonshu then becomes a disciple of Kim Kaphwan, as seen in their corresponding endings. Outside the Fatal Fury series, Jin Chonshu and Jin Chonrei have appeared in Neo Geo Battle Coliseum.

Ryuji Yamazaki 

 is first introduced as the sub-boss character of Fatal Fury 3: Road to the Final Victory, where he is a criminal known as "Dark Broker". In the game, Yamazaki is hired by the Jin brothers into recovering their Sacred Scrolls, which are able to give immortality to its user. In the following titles from the series, Yamazaki does not work for anybody, normally committing crimes just to entertain himself, despite to this, however, he had secretly still want to take that scrolls from Geese. In Garou: Mark of the Wolves, he was believed to be the perpetrator of beating all of the Khushnood Butt's best students in his Kyokugenryu karate gym, as depicted in Khushnood's ending. Yamazaki's introduction in The King of Fighters series was made as a result of three popularity polls developed by three video games journals in which players voted which character they wanted to see in The King of Fighters '97, the upcoming game from the series at that time. Yamazaki has also appeared in the crossover games Capcom vs. SNK: Millennium Fight 2000 and Capcom vs. SNK 2 as a playable character. Video games publications have commented on Yamazaki's character, with some praising his introduction in Fatal Fury 3 and development in titles from The King of Fighters. Other reviewers criticized how hard defeating him is in the Fatal Fury games and how strong he is in Capcom vs. SNK: Millennium Fight 2000 in comparison to other popular characters.

Yamazaki’s origin in The King of Fighters series eventually revealed that he was a former member of Hakkeshu, the followers of Orochi. Having had lost his father-figure yakuza boss that made him a psychopath, it saves Yamazaki from Orochi’s Riot of the Blood mind control.

Sokaku Mochizuki 

 is introduced in Fatal Fury 3 as one of the five new characters featured in the game and appears in all of the games in the Real Bout series. He is said to have the strongest psychokinetic power in the history of the art's style. In Fatal Fury 3 and the original Real Bout, his objective is to seek the Scrolls of the Jin and destroy them, because he believes that it would be a source of a Shura. His Real Bout 2 ending shows him trapping a demon larger than a house within a single paper talisman.

Introduced in Dominated Mind

Alfred 

 is the protagonist of the main story mode in Real Bout Garou Densetsu Special: Dominated Mind, a Japan-only PlayStation game based on the original Real Bout Fatal Fury Special. Prior to his debut, he appears in Real Bout Fatal Fury 2: The Newcomers as a secret final boss. When he was young, his friend John (the elderly co-pilot who accompanies Alfred) took him on a trip on his biplane. When John flew to Russian airspace, MiG missiles were sent after him, but he managed to outfly them without getting struck. John became a hero in Alfred's mind, as the man who won against the MiGs, and Alfred was charmed by flying since then. Alfred seeks to defeat White, who took over the hometown where his deceased father is interred. Alfred goes to Southtown to seek Terry Bogard's aid and help him defeat White.

Alfred appears in later games, such as the Dreamcast version of The King of Fighters '99 (as secret striker), in SNK vs. Capcom: Card Fighters Clash series (as a trading card) and in KOF: Maximum Impact 2 and KOF 2002: Unlimited Match (as a cameo in one of the stages).

White 

 is the antagonist of Real Bout Garou Densetsu Special, where he serves as Alfred's rival. A demented psycho and all-around disturbed fellow, White finds pleasure in making people suffer and follow his every wish. He uses his mind-controlling abilities to make people his personal toys, manipulating them to his desire. White enjoys playing around with those foolish enough to challenge him, using the great amount of power that he possesses. He appears to be based on the main character, Alexander DeLarge from Anthony Burgess' A Clockwork Orange novel.

Introduced in Real Bout Fatal Fury 2

Lao 
 is a character introduced in Fatal Fury: 1st Contact. He can be seen in the opening scenes of Real Bout Fatal Fury 2 and Fatal Fury First Contact. In Garou: Mark of the Wolves, he becomes a member in B. Jenet's Lillien Knights crew.

Li Xiangfei 

Li Xiangfei (Chinese: 李 香緋; Pinyin: Lǐ Xiāngfēi; Japanese: 李 香緋 Rii Shanfei) makes her first appearance in Real Bout 2. She is a 17-year-old Chinese-American girl who works part-time as waitress in her Uncle Pai's restaurant in the Chinatown district of South Town and has trained in various Chinese martial arts since an early age. She also appears in Fatal Fury: Wild Ambition as a hidden guest character.

Li Xiangfei would later make her debut in The King of Fighters series in The King of Fighters '99, forming part of the Woman Fighters Team along with King, Blue Mary, and Kasumi Todoh. She was absent in The King of Fighters 2000, but would return in The King of Fighters 2001, taking Kasumi Todoh's place from the previous game.

Rick Strowd 

 is one of the two new characters introduced in Real Bout 2.  He is a casino show boxer known as the "White Wolf of the Ring", who is the son of a Native American father and a white mother. He seeks the opportunity to fight in a championship match as well as fight Terry Bogard. Rick's Special Moves are the Shooting Star, the Divine Blast, the Hellion, and the Blazing Sun Burst. He also has a special dodging maneuver called Full Moon Fever. His Super Special is the Gaia's Breath, and his Hidden Ability is the Machine-Gun Wolf. Rick is seen to have a girlfriend, a blonde woman wearing a red dress, name unknown, with whom he rides off into sunset on horseback in his ending. Fans have speculated a probable connection between him and fellow boxer, Vanessa, from SNK's King of Fighters series, as she later began using Rick's Hellion, and had the Gaia's Breath as a DM in The King of Fighters 2002.

Introduced in Wild Ambition

Toji Sakata 

 is one of two characters who appears exclusively in Fatal Fury: Wild Ambition. He is the legendary practitioner of the fighting style . Believing that he was destined to challenge Tatsumi in a death match, this encounter never occurred since Tatsumi was eventually killed by his former student, Geese Howard. He enters the King of Fighters tournament to defeat the man who killed his rival.

Tsugumi Sendo 

 is one of the two new characters exclusive to Fatal Fury: Wild Ambition. She's a high school girl from Osaka who was taught wrestling by her father,  since an early age. However, she is secretly ashamed of this, especially after she was told by a boy she had a crush on that women wrestlers are "unfeminine", after hearing this she wanted to drop out of her wrestling training. After butting heads with her overbearing father, Kantetsu will allow her to drop out, but only under the condition that she brings a decisive victory in the King of Fighters tournament. Despite her original hatred for wrestling, she has come to enjoy fighting as she began to win matches. Some of Tsugumi's move names reference her hometown, like "Tsūtenkaku Driver", "Naniwa Lariat", and "Okonomiyaki-Ire".

Introduced in Mark of the Wolves

B. Jenet 

 (real name Jennie Behrn) is a character from both Garou: Mark of the Wolves and the King of Fighters series. Jenet is the leader of a group of pirates known as the Lillien Knights. Jenet entered the tournament hosted by Kain R. Heinlein to rob him of anything valuable he might be keeping in his mansion. In her ending, she passes out amidst the destruction of Kain's mansion after defeating him. Her crew saves her from being trapped under the rubble, but fails to secure any of the treasure they had been looking for.

In The King of Fighters Maximum Impact 2, her parents are revealed to be incredibly wealthy; she formed the Lillien Knights when she became bored of her tedious lifestyle. Before the start of the tournament, she attends a party in her otherwise occupied parents' place. While there, the son of the host attempts (and fails quite miserably) to impress her with his paltry skills in Savate. Although Jenet is rather repulsed by his arrogance and embarrassing lack of skill, she learns from him that the King of Fighters tournament is being held once again. After her Lillien Knights knock the man unconscious and rob his father, Jenet decides to join the tournament in hopes of winning the prize money. She is voiced by Rei Saitō in Japanese, and by Gina Rose in the English version of KOF: MI2.

Jenet is very comfortable around men, and her win quotes and prefight and postfight animations express that she doesn't seem very serious about fighting. In The King of Fighters XI, she was in the tournament for monetary gain strictly, and she enters with Tizoc and Gato to form the Fatal Fury/Mark of the Wolves team.

Her fighting style, the LK (Lillien Knights) arts, is similar to savate, a French form of kickboxing. Her moves are mostly made up of attacks by swooping her dress (in moves such as specials "The Hind" and "Crazy Ivan" and Super Special Move "Aurora") and she is able to control the wind (being reflected in her projectile attack "Buffrass" and her Super Special Move "Too Many Torpedoes"). She also, as a Super Special Leader Move in KOF XI, takes off her left shoe and beats her opponent with it. The move is called "An Oi Madamoiselle".

Her appearance consists of a purple dress with a skull and crossbones, red fingerless gloves, a red belt with gold lining, and blonde hair, along with stiletto heels as used in "An Oi Madamoiselle".

Freeman

Gato 

 is a character from Garou: Mark of the Wolves and the King of Fighters series. A ruthless and serious martial artist, Gato has no concerns outside of besting anyone unfortunate enough to cross his path. In his Mark of the Wolves ending, a stranger saves Kain R. Heinlein from the crumbling mansion. Gato appears to know the stranger, but he is blinded before he can act. As the mansion falls, the stranger taunts Gato, telling him to start training in order to defeat him. Gato appears to have a vision of his past and his father, and angrily swears vengeance - this insinuates that the stranger is connected to Gato's past (the stranger's outfit appears to resemble Gato's), but nothing has been officially confirmed. Gato also appears in the ending of Hotaru Futaba, who claims that he's her older brother and slaps him when he denies even knowing her. He then leaves her there, and Hotaru silently prays for Gato to come back to her and their father.

Gato first appears in the King of Fighters series in King of Fighters 2003 as part of the Outlaw Team, along with Ryuji Yamazaki and Billy Kane. Gato is summoned to Geese Howard's office and forced to cooperate in order to prevent his sister from being harmed. Gato does not like his teammates at all as revealed by the ending, in which Gato ditches the other two immediately and tells them off, leaving Yamazaki and Billy to fight. In KOF XI he is partnered with B. Jenet and Tizoc to form a Garou Team. He also immediately leaves them, though on somewhat friendlier terms (he declines their invitation to celebrate) reinforcing Hotaru's description of his true nature.

Hokutomaru

Hotaru Futaba 

 is a character who was introduced in Garou: Mark of the Wolves and also makes an appearance in Neo Geo Battle Coliseum and in the PS2 version of The King of Fighters XI. Hotaru is the daughter of a family of martial artists, but is not very fond of violence. She never wants to hurt others, which is the probable reason why her father taught her the lighter side of Chinese kenpo; the Juu-kei style, which suits her easygoing personality. There are two things that Hotaru appreciates the most after her mother's suicide: her sable, Itokatsu, and her older brother, Gato. Gato was a man who was tormented to become an accomplished martial artist, and was pushed too far by their father. Still, Hotaru knows who the real Gato is, and she is sure that he is not such a bad person at heart.

Gato's disappearance led Hotaru to a hostile city located in the United States: Second South Town, where fighting rules all, crime rules the society, and strength dictates who lives and dies. In this harsh place, Hotaru set out to find clues about her brother. She then heard news of a fighting tournament of epic proportions that would soon occur in Second South Town - "King of Fighters: Maximum Mayhem". Hotaru had a feeling that her brother would enter the tournament, as he was always looking for strong opponents to fight. Following her premonitions, Hotaru entered the tournament as well.

Kain R. Heinlein

Grant

Kevin Rian

Khushnood Butt

Kim Dong-Hwan

Kim Jae-Hoon

Rock Howard

Tizoc / King of Dinosaurs 

He started out in the Fatal Fury game Garou: Mark of the Wolves and is described as being a well-renowned and popular professional wrestler. By the time of Garou: Mark of The Wolves, Tizoc already sees himself as a washed up has-been and enters the tournament in order to gain his passion into going back into the ring. When the events of King of Fighters 2003 occur, Tizoc is an up-and-coming superstar in the professional wrestling circuit and joins the Fatal Fury team after being invited by Terry Bogard himself after his brother Andy becomes unavailable since he is teaching a young boy in Shiranui style ninjutsu in Japan (the boy would later grow up to be known as Hokutomaru in Garou).

During the tournament, several opponents, such as Tizoc's former teammate Terry, easily address King of Dinosaurs as Tizoc despite the new fighter's denials, while other characters, who may or may not identify King of Dinosaurs as Tizoc, merely deem him foolish. Despite Eisuke Ogura's pre-release claims that King Of Dinosaurs is not Tizoc, the Team Mexico ending reveals that King of Dinosaurs is in fact Tizoc who suffered a humiliating defeat by Nelson. To seek revenge, Tizoc adopted a new "heel" persona, King of Dinosaurs, relying on his teammates Ángel and Ramón to help cover his former identity. In The King of Fighters XV, King of Dinosaurs/Tizoc and Ramón would be teamed up with the former KOF XIV tournament hosts Antonov to form the new wrestling team named Team G.A.W. (Galaxy Anton Wrestling).

Introduced in Fatal Fury anime

Lily McGuire 

 is a 29-year-old dark green-haired woman who is Terry's first love interest, the adoptive daughter to Geese Howard, the caretaker to Athena Asamiya and the twin sister of Angelina Howard.

She is an orphan in the streets of South Town, but Geese takes her under his wing. She will work for him without hesitating, though she didn't like him.

Years later, Geese Howard is hosting a King of Fighters tournament, and Terry, Andy, and Joe are entering. Terry entered a bar without knowing that it is being run by Geese; Lily is there, apparently drunk and teasing the men via telling them to catch a rose that belonged to her. Terry remembers her and caught the rose. He flirts with her a little bit, but that started a fight between him and the other men. A while later, Terry finds her in the streets, talking to a group of street children that she had apparently befriended a while ago; they openly recognize each other and then speak about their lives.

During the tournament, Geese orders her to give Terry poisoned champagne, but she can't do that to him; she then broke down crying and explained the plan to Terry, who promises her he would save her from Geese's hands. During the semi-finals between Terry and Andy, the lights go out and a sniper attempts to kill Terry, but Joe saves him. Lily then, tries to show them the exit, but Geese appears in front of her and kills her with a Reppuken blast, which not only injures her gravely but throws her off the nearby window. The unfortunate Lily dies in Terry's arms.

Tony 

 is an 8-year-old brown-haired boy who is one of Terry's friends and the son of his father and Elza.

Tony first meets Terry while fishing near a construction site where Terry was temporarily working. As the two make small talk and share hot dogs, they watch as some nearby kids re-enact Terry's fight against Geese. While Terry is flattered by the display, Tony angrily tries to break it up seeing it as an insult to his idol. The kids in turn jeer and belittle Tony's father as a coward causing the latter to start beating them up. Terry steps in to stop the fight, admonishing that the stronger man wouldn't harm the weak. The two are interrupted by a challenge from Kim who requests Terry for a duel. After Terry wins, Tony immediately asks to become a disciple but is turned down. As the two leave the docks, they are approached by Krauser who easily beats Terry.

After the encounter, Tony brings his beaten idol to have him taken care of by his mother. As Terry leaves Tony relays to him that Krauser was waiting for a rematch due to Terry's wounded condition in their last fight. He is shocked when the fighter ignores the message and determinedly decides to follow Terry in his travels. Later while trying to get shake Terry out of a drunken stupor to leave a bar, they are interrupted by Axel Hawk who demands a fight. Defending his idol, he is dragged into a fight with Axel's subordinate which is the catalyst that spurs Terry out of his slump.

From then on the two travel together as Terry trains to prepare for his confrontation against Krauser. He watches as the two finally clash in Krauser's castle and is sullen by the fight's ending. He is eventually reunited with his mother and promises to one day to become as strong as Terry.

Sulia Gaudeamus 

 is a 17-year-old light-purple haired girl who becomes Terry's girlfriend and she is the younger sister of Laocorn, the daughter of Mr. and Mrs. Gaudeamus, and the childhood best friend and cousin to Athena Asamiya. She is the present-day self of Princess Sul.

Sulia is one of the last remaining descendants of Gaudeamus, a powerful conqueror who was said to even be feared by Alexander the Great. Gaudeamus was eventually killed by Alexander's generals, and his armor was infused with Mars, the God of War. Mars continued to destroy the countryside until four wanderers defeated him. His armor was buried at different parts of the globe to prevent the deity from being resurrected.

With her parents dead and the loss of her older brother, she took the pendant and ran away from her home to find a strong warrior to help stop her brother.

Once she finds him, he agrees and she is pleased to know that Andy, Joe and Mai also want to assist. During their search, Sulia gradually falls for Terry. When he is injured after a bout with Laocorn and Jamin, she uses her healing powers to help him recover. After hearing her past concerning her family, Terry promises to protect her from pain or suffering. She befriends her other helpers as their search deepens.

Despite their best efforts, Laocorn completes the Mars armor and is granted omnipotent powers. Not wanting her friends to face anymore danger, she stabs herself in the chest with a sharp crystal shard. Laocorn felt the blow since the twins were linked psychologically and physically to one another. She pleads Terry to punch her brother's chest and he reluctantly complies. This is enough to weaken the armor's hold on Laocorn and reverts him back to his senses. Before she dies, Sulia expresses her gratitude to her friends and shares a parting kiss with Terry. While facing the resurrected Gaudeamus, Terry hears her voice calling his name and he is able to deliver the decisive blow.

Laocorn Gaudeamus 

 is a 20-year-old purple-haired man who becomes one of Terry Bogard's rivals and he is the older brother of Sulia, the son of Mr. and Mrs. Gaudeamus, the best friend to Mai Shiranui and the husband of Panni. He is the main antagonist of the movie.

Having fallen victim to Mars, he serves Jamin, Hauer and Panni as his servants. After his servants are killed by the heroes, Laocorn inevitably finds all of them and is granted god-like powers. The four warriors try to stop him, but he is too strong until Sulia sacrifices herself by stabbing herself in the heart with a shard of crystal. As Laocorn and Sulia were physically and mentally linked, Laocorn felt the blow. Terry then delivers a powerful punch in his breastplate, causing him to lose the armor that Sulia died soon. Finding out that this armor revives Mars, Laocorn jumps in front of Andy and his childhood best friend, but is attacked by Mars' attack, dying in the process.

Panni 

 is a 25-year-old pink-haired woman who becomes one of Mai Shiranui's rivals and she is the daughter of King and Queen Shona, the niece of Jamin and Angelia, the wife of Laocorn and the half-sister to Athena Asamiya.

Her purple scar on her cheek is designed by her mother, Queen Shona.

In the movie, Panni kidnaps her rival and takes her to Hauer, but not before Panni chokes her by the face. But before her friend, Hauer, can do anything, Andy appears. Panni is killed by Mai's Chou Hissatsu Shinobi Bachi attack.

Hauer 

 is a 37-year-old silver-haired golden-masked man who becomes one of Andy Bogard's rivals and Mai Shiranui's arch-rivals and he is the son of Jimmy and Bonnie Blitzer, the oldest brother to Julia, Noah and Layla and the love interest of Rose Bernstein, Adelheid Bernstein's younger sister and Rugal Bernstein's daughter.

He is pleased to see Cheng defeated when he is enslaved. He is invited to The King of Dancing show, but misses it. Hearing that Andy is more handsome than him, Hauer disappears in a large gust of wind, which destroys the nightclub in an accident.

Hauer, the next day, arrives at Hebei, in China, and tries to defeat Mai in the first round, but Mai defeats him, claiming the one-round victory. Then, he defeats Mai in the second round, which he succeeds in taking her prisoner and blocks Andy's elbow, by sending him backwards. Hauer then turns around and continues to take a look at Mai, saying that she was a really beautiful young girl. He then turns Mai's head towards him, when Mai opens her eyes, revealing that a man was not Andy, but Hauer himself. Hauer almost kisses her, but Mai refuses - this enrages Andy, thus revealing his feelings for Mai. Hauer attacks Andy, and laughs whilst departing with the piece of the armor.

Hauer waits for Panni to take Mai to him, when his friend arrives with her rival, Panni chokes Mai in the face, while Hauer looks at her. Before he can do anything, Andy appears. He is killed by Andy's vicious slap, he is coughing up blood, while Mai asks if he's dead.

Jamin 

 is a 45-year-old curly red-haired man who becomes one of Joe Higashi's rivals, the husband of Angelia, the niece of Panni and the friend to Hauer.

Jamin is a servant of the Gaudeamus family. When Laocorn decided to search for the Armor of Mars, Jamin reluctantly assists his pursuit in chasing. He tracks down and follows Sulia and her companions to ascertain the location of the remaining pieces of the Armor.

Jamin and Laocorn briefly attack Terry and Sulia in Germany, but the two manage to escape. Along with Hauer and Panni, he ambushes Sulia's group while they're resting at a hotel. After threats are made to harm her companions, Sulia acquiesces and lets Jamin take her to Laocorn. He travels to Israel to guard the entrance to the temple while Laocorn claimed the last piece.

Despite being far superior in terms of power, Jamin intentionally loses his fight against Terry so the latter could save Laocorn and Sulia, and dies right after wishing the Gaudeamus siblings to be saved from such a horrible destiny.

In The King of Fighters XI movie, Jamin awakens from his death by Princess Athenia and apologizes to Sulia for everything he has done. When they arrive, he reunites with his rival.

Reception
The characters from Fatal Fury have received major positive reaction with GamesRadar calling Terry Bogard as "one of SNK's most memorable characters", as 86th "most memorable, influential, and badass" protagonist in games. IGN praised the increase of the series' cast but heavily criticized the final boss Geese Howard for his high difficulty. Avi Krebs from GamingExcellence.com commented that Billy Kane is one of the hardest boss characters from the first Fatal Fury, but he remains "pale" in comparison to Geese. Kotaku's Patricia Hernandez wrote "one of Fatal Fury 2'''s biggest contributions to the medium was that it was the first game to introduce a character with breasts that moved on their own. Known as Mai Shiranui, that character is famed for having very, uh, lively breasts. Though Fatal Fury may not be a huge franchise nowadays, its legacy is very much alive: many top fighting games include a similar jiggle effect". While acknowledging that Fatal Fury fans might be disappointed by the reduced roster of fighters in Fatal Fury 3, GamePro praised the new third fighting plane and ranking system, and concluded that "instead of simply adding more fighters, FF3 does more with fewer fighters (hidden moves and so on) and a unique method of gameplay". They remarked that Bob and Franco are "uninteresting" new characters but praising and the modifications to Mai Shiranui's Swan Dive attack. The cast of Garou was praised for their animations which was compared with the ones from Marvel vs. Capcom 2''.

THEM Anime Reviews criticized the characterization of the main characters in the three films citing them as "one-dimensional" and also the villains. On the other hand, Anime News Network's Bamboo Dong enjoyed the portrayal of the characters in the films, particularly praising Terry's character development as "most adaptations of this nature barely let their characters show any weaknesses at all, much less an extended period of insecurity and despair, so it was pretty compelling seeing Terry's journey through his dark period". In another review, Dong praised the selection of the main characters. Chris Beveridge from Mania Beyond Entertainment also praised the development of the characters such as the interactions between the couple of Andy Bogard and Mai Shiranui as well as the grief of Terry over the loss of his girlfriend.

References 

 
Fatal Fury